The Joseon dynasty ruled Korea, succeeding the 400-year-old Goryeo dynasty in 1392 through the Japanese annexation in 1910. Twenty-seven monarchs ruled over united Korea for more than 500 years.

List of monarchs

See also
 List of monarchs of Korea

Joseon